The 2012 OFC Nations Cup was an international football tournament that was held in the Solomon Islands from 1 to 10 June 2012. The 11 national teams involved in the tournament were required to register a squad of players; only players in these squads were eligible to take part in the tournament.  An initial four-team qualifying phase took place in Samoa from 22 to 26 November 2011 allowing the winner, Samoa, to move on and join the other seven teams at the main tournament.

Players marked (c) were named as captain for their national squad. Players' club teams and players' age are as of 1 June 2012 – the tournament's opening day.

A full list of all the national teams squads, with date of birth and shirt number can be seen on OFC official site.

Group A

Vanuatu
Coach: Percy Avock

New Caledonia
Coach:  Alain Moizan

Samoa
Coach: Malo Vaga

Tahiti
Coach: Eddy Etaeta

Group B

Fiji
Coach:  Juan Carlos Buzzetti

New Zealand
Coach: Ricki Herbert

Solomon Islands
Coach: Jacob Moli

Papua New Guinea
Coach:  Frank Farina

Player representation

By club nationality 

Nations in italics are not represented by their national teams in the finals.

By representatives of domestic league

References

squads
OFC Nations Cup squads